= List of tallest buildings in Samara =

Samara is the 2nd largest city in the Russian federal subject of Samara. The tallest building in the city is the Rook residential complex whose height is the 122 meters it is the most recently tallest completed building in the city since 2008, while the second tallest one is the skyscraper named Vertical and whose height is 108 meters. Samara normally had the tallest buildings which had the height of 85 meters or over.

== Famous buildings ==
=== Rook Residential Complex ===
The Rook Residential Complex or RRC is called the tallest building in Samara. It is located just 300 meters (0.3 km) from the Volga River and consists of three residential buildings, two of which have 25 floors and one - 18. The construction of the complex with all the adjacent infrastructure began in 2002, and already in 2004 Rook hosted the first tenants to 2008, the construction was completely completed. The most distant point of knowledge from the earth is at the level of 122 meters, today in the city there are no more buildings whose height would approach such a mark. The total area of the entire complex is 80 thousand square meters. Regularly, in order to enjoy the beautiful view from a height of 95 or 70 meters, excursion groups rise on the roofs of houses.

=== Samara Railway Station building ===
The building of the Samara Railway Station - the tallest railway building in Europe - is the pride of urban residents, which immediately became a tourist attraction. Its dome reaches a height of 101 meters. The area of the entire complex is 32 thousand square meters. Start of the construction of the present station was given in 1996, and after 5 years, about 12 thousand people began to pass the Samara station every day. At the same time, about 2,600 passengers can be in the station. In addition, it is worth noting that the stained-glass window area is 9,100 square meters. Also at the level of 95 meters in the building there is an observation deck with a view of Samara

=== Others ===
Far from the lowest building in Samara is the building of OAO Gazprom Transgaz Samara. The 92-meter 24-storey building with an area of 24 thousand square meters is an administrative and dispatch building, there is also one technical and two underground floors. Construction of the facility was started in 2007, and in the spring of 2012, employees of the company will be able to "settle" in a new office.

One of the tallest office buildings in Samara is the Vertical Shopping and Office Center. In 2005, the construction company began work, and by 2010 the project was not only on paper, but also implemented in the central part of Samara. The construction with an area of 41,683 square meters is a building that includes 4 floors of retail space and an office 27-storey tower, the height of which reaches 106 meters.

The modern office center Skala Hall is part of the Skala shopping center, located on Moskovsky Highway. In a 23-storey building in 16 720 square meters there are offices of Samara and nonresident companies.

Despite the large number of high-rise buildings intended for trade and offices, it was not uncommon to find a tall residential building in Samara. For example, not far from the Volga flaunts the Sovremennik residential complex . It consists of houses in 23, 24 and 25 floors. The total area reaches 52,640 square meters. meters. For the first time, Samara residents were able to acquire real estate in this complex and will settle after the completion of most of the buildings in December 2011. The construction company promises that by the end of 2012 the construction of the complex will be completed.

As Samru.ru was informed in the department of construction and architecture of the city administration Samara, a group of companies "Volgatransstroy", erecting in Samara such buildings as the residential complex "Ladia", the railway station railway station plans to erect a 34-storey building. Note that a building permit has not yet been received.

Also in the quarter "City of the World", or rather in the residential complex "Moscow", it is planned to build a house called "Spasskaya Tower", whose height will be about 104 meters. The commissioning of the residential complex is planned in the first quarter of 2013.

== List of tallest buildings ==
As of 2018, there are 720 high rise buildings and skyscrapers.

Rank	Name	Height in meters	Height in feet	Floors	Since
1.	Rook Residencial Complex	122	400	35	2008
2.	Vertical	109	357	27	2009
3.	Ladya 2	107	351	29	2006
4.	Ladya 3	107	351	29	2008
5.	Gazprom Transgaz Samara	101	331	23	2012
6.	Moscow	98	321	27	2014
7.	Samara Railway Station	98	321	15	2001
8.	Samara Portal Building	98	321	22	2014
9.	Record 1	98	321	27	2018
10.	Favorit B	98	321	27	2016
11.	Favorit A	98	321	27	2016
12.	Revolutionnaya 101b	94	308	26	2018
13.	Dybenko 27v	91	298	25	2018
14.	Dybenko 27a	91	298	25	2018
15.	Raketa	91	298	25	2018
16.	Solnechnaya 18	91	298	25	2017
17.	Lunacharskogo 5	91	298	25	2016
18.	Artsibyshevskaya 204	91	298	25	2015
19.	Albatros	91	298	25	2018
20.	Privolzhsky 2	91	298	25	2016
21.	Gorod Solntsa 3	91	298	25	2015
22.	Gorod Solntsa 2	91	298	25	2015
